Spasskoye is a rural locality (a village) in Sidorovskoye Rural Settlement, Gryazovetsky District, Vologda Oblast, Russia. The population was 326 as of 2002.

Geography 
Spasskoye is located 37 km east of Gryazovets (the district's administrative centre) by road. Lezha is the nearest rural locality.

References 

Rural localities in Gryazovetsky District